is a Japanese actor.

Career
Takitō belonged to Tatsuya Nakadai's acting academy and theater troupe Mumeijuku from 1998 to 2007.

Filmography

Films
Godzilla: Tokyo S.O.S. (2003) 
Climber's High (2009) – Shusaku Kanzawa
Fish Story (2009) – A rapist
Golden Slumber (2010)
Lesson of the Evil (2012) 
Seiji: Riku no Sakana (2012) – Makoto
Unforgiven (2013) – Yasaburō Himeji
Rurouni Kenshin: Kyoto Inferno (2014) – Hoji Sadojima
Love’s Whirlpool (2014) – A salaryman
Rurouni Kenshin: The Legend Ends (2014) – Hoji Sadojima
Bilocation (2014)
64: Part I (2016) – Akama
64: Part II (2016) – Akama
The Inerasable (2016) – Naoto
Scoop! (2016) – Baba
Sekigahara (2017) – Toyotomi Hideyoshi
Enokida Trading Post (2018)
The Blood of Wolves (2018) - Daisuke Saga
Rainbow Days (2018)
Kamen Rider Heisei Generations Forever (2018) - Futaros (voice)
The 47 Ronin in Debt (2019)
Show Me the Way to the Station (2019)
Shadowfall (2019)
First Love (2019)
The Confidence Man JP: Episode of the Princess (2020)
The Night Beyond the Tricornered Window (2021)
Remain in Twilight (2021)
Last of the Wolves (2021) - Daisuke Saga
The Way of the Househusband (2022) – Torajiro
Natchan's Little Secret (2023)

Television
Bio Planet WoO (2006)
Bloody Monday (2008) – Shirota
Ryōmaden (2010) – Komatsu Tatewaki
Umechan Sensei (2012) 
Amachan (2013) 
Hanzawa Naoki (2013) – Naosuke Kondo
Border (2014) - Suzuki
Jūhan Shuttai! (2016)
Yūsha Yoshihiko (2016) – Robin
The Supporting Actors (2017) – Himself
Black Leather Notebook (2017) – Tōru Murai
Border 2 Redemption (2017) - Suzuki
Hanbun, Aoi (2018)
Boys Over Flowers Season 2 (2018) – Iwao Kaguragi
Miss Sherlock (2018) – Inspector Gentaro Reimon
Princess Jellyfish (2018) - Mejiro Juon
Kirin ga Kuru (2020–21) - Ashikaga Yoshiaki
The Way of the Househusband (2020) – Torajiro
The Supporting Actors 3 (2021) – Himself
Love You as the World Ends (2021) – Koki Shuto

Anime
Sushi & Beyond: What the Japanese Know About Cooking (2015) – Toshi
Kanashiki Debu Neko-chan (2021) – Maru

Stage
The Merry Wives of Windsor (2001) – Bardolph
Death of a Salesman (2002) – Stanley

Video Games
 Judgment (2018) - Kazuya Ayabe

Dubbing
Alice Through the Looking Glass, Time (Sacha Baron Cohen)
Miles Ahead, Miles Davis (Don Cheadle)

References

External links
 Official profile 
 

1976 births
Japanese male film actors
Japanese male stage actors
Japanese male television actors
Japanese male voice actors
Living people
People from Nagoya
Actors from Aichi Prefecture
20th-century Japanese male actors
21st-century Japanese male actors